West Brothers Knitting Company is a historic knitting mill located in the Westside neighborhood of Syracuse, Onondaga County, New York. West Brothers was built in 1906–1907, and is a three-story, 20 bay by 6 bay, red brick mill building with a raised basement. It is of standard mill construction. The front facade features a three-bay, four-story elevator tower. The West Knitting Corporation moved to Wadesboro, North Carolina in 1928. The mill later housed a corrugated paper container manufacturer, the Gray Brothers Boot & Shoe Manufacturing Company, and most recently a manufacturer of a wide variety of air filters.

It was listed on the National Register of Historic Places in 2014.

References 

Textile mills in New York (state)
Industrial buildings and structures on the National Register of Historic Places in New York (state)
Industrial buildings completed in 1907
Buildings and structures in Syracuse, New York
National Register of Historic Places in Syracuse, New York
Shoe factories
Knitting